Maria Roy (born 7 November 1987) is an Indian actress who entered the Malayalam film industry in late 2006. She is the niece of Booker Prize winner Arundhati Roy. She is married to Smith.

Career
Maria is a South Indian film actress who worked primarily in the Malayalam film industry. Her debut movie was Notebook, directed by Rosshan Andrrews, in which she played a schoolgirl named Sridevi.

She spent six years in the UK and New York for detailed studies in different dance styles.

Films
In Notebook, she was cast as Sreedevi, the relatively quiet girl of the three friends in the film, who dies midway through. Her second role was in the 2013 Malayalam film Hotel California, with Jayasurya.

Filmography

References

External links

Living people
Actresses from Kottayam
Indian film actresses
Actresses in Malayalam cinema
21st-century Indian actresses
1989 births